Geoffrey Stone (10 April 1924 – August 1993) was an English footballer who made 35 appearances in the Football League playing as a centre half for Notts County and Darlington. He went on to play non-league football for Consett.

References

1924 births
1993 deaths
Footballers from Mansfield
English footballers
Association football defenders
Notts County F.C. players
Darlington F.C. players
Consett A.F.C. players
English Football League players